Anayo Emmanuel Iwuala (born 20 March 1999) is a Nigerian professional footballer who plays as a winger for CR Belouizdad, on loan from Espérance de Tunis, and the Nigeria national team.

Career
Iwuala signed to ES Tunis at the beginning of the 2021–22 season. In September 2021, Espérance Tunis played the Super Cup final in which Iwuala scored the only goal of the game helping the team to win the cup.

International career
Iwuala debuted for the Nigeria national team in a 1–0 2021 Africa Cup of Nations qualification win over Benin on 27 March 2021.

Honours
ES Tunis
 Tunisian Super Cup: 2020–21

References

External links
 

1999 births
Living people
Nigerian footballers
Nigeria international footballers
Association football wingers
Delta Force F.C. players
Enyimba F.C. players
Nigeria Professional Football League players
Espérance Sportive de Tunis players
CR Belouizdad players